Colorado's 14th Senate district is one of 35 districts in the Colorado Senate. It has been represented by Democrat Joann Ginal since 2019, following her appointment to succeed fellow Democrat John Kefalas.

Geography
District 14 is exactly coterminous with the city of Fort Collins in Larimer County.

The district is located entirely within Colorado's 2nd congressional district, and overlaps with the 52nd and 53rd districts of the Colorado House of Representatives.

Recent election results
Colorado state senators are elected to staggered four-year terms; under normal circumstances, the 14th district holds elections in presidential years.

2020
In 2018, incumbent Senator John Kefalas won a seat on the Larimer County Board of Commissioners, cutting his legislative term short. Then-State Rep. Joann Ginal was chosen to replace him in the Senate, narrowly defeating fellow State Rep. Jeni Arndt 45-42 at a Democratic vacancy committee meeting.

2016

2012

Federal and statewide results in District 14

References 

14
Larimer County, Colorado